John 1:9 is the ninth verse in the first chapter of the Gospel of John in the New Testament of the Christian Bible.

Content
In the original Greek according to Westcott-Hort this verse is:
Ἦν τὸ φῶς τὸ ἀληθινόν, ὃ φωτίζει πάντα ἄνθρωπον ἐρχόμενον εἰς τὸν κόσμον.  

In the King James Version of the Bible the text reads:
That was the true Light, which lighteth every man that cometh into the world.

The New International Version translates the passage as:
The true light that gives light to every man was coming into the world.

Analysis
In terms of the expression "true light," Lapide says that "because Christ illuminates us far more truly and perfectly than any corporeal light does, therefore spiritual light alone deserves the name of light." He goes on to say that visible light is merely a shadow of the true. In like manner Christ says in John 15:1, "I am the true Vine." Also in John 6:55, He calls Himself the "true Bread." So that in a sense "that which is perfect, and of surpassing excellency, is often called true."

The phrase "coming in the world" MacEvilly interprets to mean "born into the world," so that it agrees with "every man" and not with "the true light."

Commentary from the Church Fathers
Augustine: "What Light it is to which John bears witness, he shows himself, saying, That was the true Light."

Chrysostom: "Or thus; Having said above that John had come, and was sent, to bear witness of the Light, lest any from the recent coming of the witness, should infer the same of Him who is witnessed to, the Evangelist takes us back to that existence which is beyond all beginning, saying, That was the true Light."

Augustine: "Wherefore is there added, true? Because man enlightened is called light, but the true Light is that which lightens. For our eyes are called lights, and yet, without a lamp at night, or the sun by day, these lights are open to no purpose. Wherefore he adds: which lighteneth every man: but if every man, then John himself. He Himself then enlightened the person, by whom He wished Himself to be pointed out. And just as we may often, from the reflection of the sun’s rays on some object, know the sun to be risen, though we cannot look at the sun itself; as even feeble eyes can look at an illuminated wall, or some object of that kind: even so, those to whom Christ came, being too weak to behold Him, He threw His rays upon John; John confessed the illumination, and so the Illuminator Himself was discovered. It is said, that cometh into the world. Had man not departed from Him, he had not had to be enlightened; but therefore is he to be here enlightened, because he departed thence, when he might have been enlightened."

Theophylact of Ohrid: "Let the Manichean blush, who pronounces us the creatures of a dark and malignant creator: for we should never be enlightened, were we not the children of the true Light."

Chrysostom: "Where are those too, who deny Him to be very God? We see here that He is called very Light. But if He lighteneth every man that cometh into the world, how is it that so many have gone on without light? For all have not known the worship of Christ. The answer is: He only enlighteneth every man, so far as pertains to Him. If men shut their eyes, and will not receive the rays of this light, their darkness arises not from the fault of the light, but from their own wickedness, inasmuch as they voluntarily deprive themselves of the gift of grace. For grace is poured out upon all; and they, who will not enjoy the gift, may impute it to their own blindness."

Augustine: "Or the words, lighteneth every man, may be understood to mean, not that there is no one who is not enlightened, but that no one is enlightened except by Him."

Bede: " Including both natural and divine wisdom; for as no one can exist of himself, so no one can be wise of himself."

Origen: "Or thus: We must not understand the words, lighteneth every man that cometh into the world, of the growth from hidden seeds to organized bodies, but of the entrance into the invisible world, by the spiritual regeneration and grace, which is given in Baptism. Those then the true Light lighteneth, who come into the world of goodness, not those who rush into the world of sin."

Theophylact of Ohrid: "Or thus: The intellect which is given in us for our direction, and which is called natural reason, is said here to be a light given us by God. But some by the ill use of their reason have darkened themselves."

References

External links
Other translations of John 1:9 at BibleHub

01:9
Light and religion